Sister 7 is an American rock band from Austin, Texas.

Patrice Pike originally met guitarist Wayne Sutton when they were high school students in Dallas, Texas. The two formed a band and began writing and rehearsing in 1991. They both opted to forgo college to concentrate on music in Pike's freshman year.

Originally called 'Little Sister,' the band began playing in Dallas at venues such as Club Dada. They would eventually relocate to Austin where the group quickly moved from being an opening band into a headlining role. The band remained popular in Austin for many years.

The band's debut EP appeared in 1994, followed by a full-length, self-produced recording and appearances on the H.O.R.D.E. Tour.

As a result of a dispute regarding the name "Little Sister"—a Boston-based cover band from Boston threatened to bar them from playing in the State of Massachusetts unless the Texas band paid them $40,000 --, the band decided to change its name. The name Sister 7 was chosen after members discovered there were six other bands in the United States performing as "Little Sister." The members also didn't want legal threats similar to those promised by the Boston group because it was in negotiations with Arista Austin.

The band released two further full-length studio albums and scored a hit with the song "Know What You Mean," which reached #21 on the Adult Top 40 charts and #76 on the Billboard Hot 100. The group disbanded for two years in 2001; that same year, the band re-released its debut album as well as a live album.

Pike and Sutton still perform and tour as a duo. They and original bassist Darrell Phillips periodically perform in the Austin area as Sister 7.

Members
Patrice Pike - vocals
Wayne Sutton - guitar
Darrell Phillips - bass
Sean Phillips - drums

Discography
Free Love and Nickel Beer EP (SBK Records, 1994)
Little Sister/Sister 7 (Rhythmic Records, 1994)
This the Trip (Arista Austin, 1997)
Wrestling Over Tiny Matters (Arista Austin, 2000)
Live (Dualtone Records, 2001)

Appears on
"Flesh and Bones" on Lilith Fair New Music Sampler (1998)

References

1991 establishments in Texas
Musical groups established in 1991
Musical groups from Austin, Texas
Rock music groups from Texas